Thirteen Down is the 13th album by Scottish folk musician Bert Jansch, released in 1980. The album, credited as "The Bert Jansch Conundrum", originally appeared with at least three different sleeves, in the UK, US and Australia. There were also, on some or all of these packagings, dubious writing credits for "If I Had A Lover" and "Sweet Mother Earth", adaptations of a Swedish and Brazilian song respectively.

Track listing
"Una Linea Di Dolcezza" (Jansch) - 3:40
"Let Me Sing" (Jansch) - 3:06
"Down River" (Jansch) - 3:17
"Nightfall" (Jenkins) - 2:56
"If I Had a Lover" (Jansch) - 2:15
"Time And Love" (Jansch) - 3:10
"In My Mind" (Jansch) - 2:22
"Sovay" (Trad., arr. Jansch, Jenkins, Smith) - 2:55
"Where Did My Life Go" (Jansch) - 2:56
"Single Rose" (Jansch) - 2:50
"Ask Your Daddy" (Jansch) - 2:57
"Sweet Mother Earth" (Milton Nascimento / Chico Buarque - "O cio da Terra") - 3:48
"Bridge" (Jansch, Jenkins) - 2:34

Personnel
Bert Jansch - guitar, vocals
Martin Jenkins - mandocello, violin, flute, vocals
Nigel Portman Smith - bass, Fender Rhodes, accordion
Luce Langridge - drums, percussion
Jacqui McShee - lead vocals on 5

References

Bert Jansch albums
1980 albums